We Were Children is a 2012 Canadian documentary film about the experiences of First Nations children in the Canadian Indian residential school system.

Directed by Tim Wolochatiuk and written by Jason Sherman, the film recounts the experiences of two residential school survivors: Lyna Hart, who was sent to the Guy Hill Residential School in Manitoba at age 4; and Glen Anaquod, who was sent to the Lebret Indian Residential School in Saskatchewan. We Were Children combines interviews with the two with dramatic recreations of their experiences.

According to Hart, her participation in the film marked the first time that she had shared the full story of her time in the school. She has stated that she regards her involvement in We Were Children as a key step in her healing process. Anaquod died in 2011 before the film's completion; a private screening of the film was held for his family. Hart died in 2015 after the release of the film.

Production
Eagle Vision's executive producer Lisa Meeches—whose parents and older siblings were sent to residential schools, and who spent over 7 years travelling across Canada to collect residential school survivors' stories for the Government of Canada—has stated that the idea for the film originated from a discussion she had had at the Banff World Media Festival. It was Meeches who approached director Tim Wolochatiuk with the project.

The film was shot in Manitoba, namely in Winnipeg, St-Pierre-Jolys, and at the former Portage residential school (now the Rufus Prince building) in Portage la Prairie. It was produced by Kyle Irving for Eagle Vision, Loren Mawhinney for eOne Television, and produced and executive produced by David Christensen for the National Film Board of Canada.

CBC Manitoba reporter Sheila North Wilson assisted the production by translating material in the script from English to Cree.

Cast 
The film's cast includes both acting performances and interviewees, as We Were Children combines interviews of its two subjects with dramatic recreations of their experiences. Among the cast were:

 Lyna Hart — self
 Alicia Hamelin — Lyna, 4 years old
 Jade Hamelin — Lyna, 10 years old
 Jennie Morin — Lyna, 18 yrs old
 Glen Anaquod — self
 René Batson — Glen, 6–7 years old
 Brun Montour (as Bruin Montour) — Glen, 12 yrs old (as Bruin Montour)
 Justin Ducharme — Glen, 18 years old
 Justin Courchene — Glen, Adult
 Darcy Fehr — Glen's Teacher Priest
 Darren Felbel — Priest, Saskatchewan
 Rebecca Gibson — Sister Mary
 Lois Brothers — Glen's Teacher
 Fawnda Neckoway - Lyna's Mother
 Glenn Cochrane — Lyna's Grandfather
 Kayla Contois-Moar — Virginia

Release
We Were Children premiered on 2 October 2012 at the Vancouver International Film Festival, followed by a screening at the imagineNATIVE Film + Media Arts Festival in Toronto on October 18. It was broadcast on the Aboriginal Peoples Television Network in March 2013, followed by a DVD release from the National Film Board of Canada on 12 April 2013.

See also
 Sleeping Children Awake, a 1992 documentary about residential schools
Where the Spirit Lives, a 1989 drama about residential schools
Our Spirits Don't Speak English, a 2008 documentary film about Native American boarding schools in the United States

References

External links
 
 Blog post by Lisa Meeches and trailer at the National Film Board of Canada
 Global BC Morning News, Shaw Media Inc.

Films shot in Winnipeg
Canadian documentary films
2012 films
2012 documentary films
Documentary films about First Nations
National Film Board of Canada documentaries
Documentary films about child abuse
Documentary films about Indigenous rights in Canada
Films produced by David Christensen
Works about residential schools in Canada
2010s English-language films
2010s Canadian films